Radley is an unincorporated community in Liberty Township, Grant County, Indiana.

History
A post office was established at Radley in 1899, and remained in operation until it was discontinued in 1911. According to one source, Radley was named for the postmaster's father-in-law.

Geography

References

Unincorporated communities in Grant County, Indiana
Unincorporated communities in Indiana